In United States agricultural policy, Farm acreage base referred to the total of the crop acreage bases (wheat, feed grains, cotton, and rice) for a farm for a year, the average acreage planted to soybeans and other non-program crops, and the average acreage devoted to conserving uses (excluding Acreage Reduction Program land)
The 1996 farm bill (P.L. 104-127) and the 2002 farm bill (P.L. 107-121) eliminate the need to calculate a farm acreage base.

References

United States Department of Agriculture